Hannah Louise Spearritt (born 1 April 1981) is an English actress and singer. She is an original member of the pop group S Club 7. Spearritt is also known for playing the role of Abby Maitland in the British science-fiction drama Primeval.

Career

1994–1998: Stage
When she was 12, Spearritt landed a part in the Lowestoft Players amateur dramatics society's production of Annie. Thereafter, she successfully auditioned for the National Youth Music Theatre, and became part of the company. (1994–1995), Tin Pan Ali (1996), and the West End musical Bugsy Malone (1997). In 1998, she was cast in the television film The Cater Street Hangman, playing the role of a maid who gets murdered. Spearritt also made appearances on the National Lottery and Blue Peter.

1999–2003: S Club 7

In 1998, Spearritt auditioned for and became a member of S Club 7. In the five years they were together, the group had four UK number one singles and a UK number one album. They recorded a total of four studio albums, released eleven singles and went on to sell over fourteen million albums worldwide. Their first album, S Club, had a strong 1990s pop sound, similar to many artists of their time. However, through the course of their career, their musical approach changed to a more dance and R&B sound which is heard mostly in their final album, Seeing Double. S Club 7 won two BRIT Awards—in 2000 for British breakthrough act and in 2002, for Best British Single. In 2001, the group earned the Record of the Year award. On 21 April 2003, during a live onstage performance, S Club announced that they were to disband.

2003–present: Acting
In 2003, she was in Los Angeles to audition for a role in the film Agent Cody Banks 2: Destination London, a fact that she revealed at the UK premiere of the film on 24 March 2004 in London. In 2004, Spearritt appeared in horror film Seed of Chucky. In 2005, she appeared in the BBC series Blessed as Sarah. In December 2005, Spearritt appeared in the West End musical Snow! The Musical, at London's Sound Theatre.

In 2006, it was revealed that Spearritt had landed a lead role in the ITV series Primeval. She portrayed the role of Abby Maitland, a reptile enthusiast who gets mixed up with time travelling Professor Nick Cutter (Douglas Henshall) after discovering a species of reptile she had never encountered. Later that year, she made an appearance in  Agatha Christie's Marple. In March 2012, Spearritt took over the role of Pauline in One Man, Two Guvnors at the Theatre Royal Haymarket. She participated with S Club 7 in a reunion tour, titled Bring It All Back 2015, which toured the UK in May 2015. In December 2015, it was confirmed that Spearritt would star as Mercedes Christie in the BBC medical drama Casualty. Spearritt made her debut on 23 January 2016. In 2017, Spearritt joined the cast of EastEnders as Kandice Taylor, the sister of Karen Taylor (Lorraine Stanley), leaving the show when she got pregnant.

Personal life
Spearritt and Paul Cattermole met in 1994 when both were members of the National Youth Music Theatre. In 1999, Spearritt and Cattermole became members of S Club 7.  They dated from 2001 until 2006. In 2006 Spearritt started dating Andrew-Lee Potts, her co-star on the series Primeval; the couple were engaged from 2008 until 2013.

On 20 December 2018, it was announced that Spearritt had given birth to a baby girl. In December 2020, Spearritt announced the birth of her second child, a girl, both with her boyfriend Adam Thomas.

Spearritt is the niece of Eddie Spearritt, who played professional football in the then-top level of the English football league system.

In January 2023, Spearitt revealed that she and her family had been homeless over the recent Christmas period, after their landlord left them with two days to find a new place to stay. "What screwed us is we didn't have time to find another place," she said. "We had somewhere over Christmas but ran out of time before we could move in. It was just a couple of weeks. We were allowed to stay in our friend's office. We just used it as our living room."

Stage

Filmography

Awards and nominations

References

External links

 

1981 births
20th-century English actresses
20th-century British women singers
21st-century English actresses
21st-century British women singers
Actors from Norfolk
Brit Award winners
English film actresses
English musical theatre actresses
English soap opera actresses
English television actresses
English women pop singers
Living people
Musicians from Norfolk
People from Great Yarmouth
S Club 7 members